"When My Man Comes Home" is a 1944 song by Buddy Johnson and His Orchestra.  The single with vocals by Ella Johnson was the most successful R&B hit of Buddy Johnson's career.  "When My Man Comes Home" went to number one on the Harlem Hit Parade for one week and peaked at number eighteen on the pop chart.

References

1944 songs
Songs written by Buddy Johnson
Song articles with missing songwriters